Vashon High School is a high school of the St. Louis Public Schools in St. Louis, Missouri. When it opened in 1927, it was the second high school for black students in St. Louis.

History
Designed by Rockwell M. Milligan, the school opened on September 11, 1927, and it was named in honor of two African-American educators: George Boyer Vashon, the first black graduate of Oberlin College, and his son, John Boyer Vashon. Located at 3026 Laclede Avenue, the school was built for slightly less than $1.2 million ($ today). Vashon was the second high school built for black students in the St. Louis Public Schools, after Sumner High School.

Four members of the Vashon glee club created the popular singing group The Four Vagabonds in 1933. From 1935 to 1949, Vashon's boys basketball program won six state titles as part of the Missouri Negro Interscholastic Athletic Association. Vashon was barred from joining the Missouri State High School Activities Association until 1949, and between 1949 and 1954, it was prohibited from participating in both MNIAA tournaments and MSHSAA state tournaments.

In June 1963, the school moved to the Hadley Vocational-Technical High School building at 3405 Bell Avenue, and the original building became part of Harris–Stowe State University. The Bell Avenue building had been built in the early 1930s with large shop classrooms that were subsequently divided into classrooms and offices with partition walls, causing noise problems throughout the school. Its architectural design also strongly resembled a factory, and according to a local newspaper report, "the main school building, gym and auditorium make one think the people inside might be manufacturing cars or widgets." The move was accompanied by protests in the local community and a student march against the transfer.

After the transfer, Vashon students were offered more vocational classes, including auto repair, fashion design, cosmetology, dry cleaning, woodworking, shoe repair, drafting, and commercial cooking. From 1974 to 2006, Vashon's boys basketball team was coached by Floyd Irons, a Vashon alumnus who became one of the winningest basketball coaches in Missouri history. Irons coached the team to four state championships in the 1980s.

In 1990, the Board of Education considered several options to deal with noise problems and facilities issues at Vashon; among the options were closure of Vashon, partial renovation, full renovation, or complete demolition and replacement. Ultimately the Board decided against closure and opted for partial renovation of the building; support from the school's alumni and the school's strong boys basketball program played a role in the decision to keep the school open. In 1994, the Vashon boys basketball team won another state championship under Irons.

In August 2002, Vashon moved again, to a new building at 3035 Cass Avenue designed by Kennedy and Associates and built at a cost of $47.3  million. The boys' basketball team won five state championships in the 2000s: in 2000, 2001, 2002, 2004, and 2006. In 2005, the school's boys' basketball program was ranked as the top program in the United States by USA Today.

In 2006, the Riverfront Times, a local newspaper, published an investigative report that detailed extensive allegations of misconduct by Floyd Irons as coach at Vashon. The allegations eventually led the Missouri State High School Activities Association (MSHSAA) to strip Vashon of its 2001, 2002, and 2006 titles due to violations of MSHSAA rules on recruiting and eligibility. In July 2006, Irons was dismissed as coach and administrator at Vashon, and he was replaced as head coach by Anthony Bonner, a retired NBA player and Vashon alumnus. Bonner himself resigned in 2009.

Sports and activities
Since 1934, the school has won 14 state basketball championships – six as a member of the Missouri Negro Interscholastic Athletic Association and then eight as a member of the Missouri State High School Activities Association.
For the 2011–2012 school year, the school offered 18 activities approved by the Missouri State High School Activities Association (MSHSAA): baseball, boys and girls basketball, cheerleading, boys and girls cross country, football, music activities, boys and girls soccer, softball, speech and debate, boys and girls tennis, boys and girls track and field, girls volleyball, and wrestling. In addition to its current activities, its students have won several state championships:
Boys basketball: 1935, 1936, 1944, 1947, 1948, 1949, 1971, 1983, 1985, 1986, 1988, 1994, 2000, 2004, 2016, 2017
Boys cross country: 1956, 1958, 1960
Boys track and field: 1984
The school also has produced one individual wrestling state champion.

Notable people

Faculty
 Anthony Bonner, professional basketball player

Alumni

 Virgil Akins, world champion boxer
 Devon Alexander, world champion boxer
 Henry Armstrong, world champion boxer
 Anthony Bonner, professional basketball player (later became faculty and basketball coach at Vashon)
 Jerry Jerome Brown Jr, NFL and CFL football player; last played with the Dallas Cowboys.
 Butler By'not'e, professional football player
 Mac Cody, professional football player
 Chick Finney, jazz pianist
 Will Franklin, professional football player
 Lloyd L. Gaines, key player in Missouri ex rel. Gaines v. Canada, which desegregated the University of Missouri School of Law
 Grant Green, jazz guitarist
 Donny Hathaway, singer and songwriter
 Ed Hopson, Olympic boxer (class of 1990) and IBF Super Feather weight Champion (1995)
 Elston Howard, professional baseball player, first African-American player for the New York Yankees
 Oliver Lee Jackson, painter, sculptor, printmaker, and educator.
 Terry Kennedy, politician, former activist, and journalist
 Roscoe L. Koontz, pioneer in health physics
 Jimmy McKinney, professional basketball player
 Theodore McMillian, judge of the Missouri Court of Appeals and United States Court of Appeals for the Eighth Circuit; first African-American judge on either court
 Leon Spinks, U.S. Olympic and professional boxer best known for beating Muhammad Ali
 Michael Spinks, champion Olympic and professional boxer
 Norris Stevenson, first African-American scholarship athlete for the University of Missouri football program
 Clark Terry, jazz musician
 Morris Towns, professional football player
 Quincy Troupe, author and poet (attended Vashon, but transferred to Beaumont)
 Quincy Trouppe, former MLB player (Cleveland Indians)
 Maxine Waters, member of the United States House of Representatives

References

External links
 School website
 Photographs of the Bell Avenue building

High schools in St. Louis
Educational institutions established in 1927
School buildings completed in 2002
Historically segregated African-American schools in Missouri
Public high schools in Missouri
1927 establishments in Missouri
Buildings and structures in St. Louis